DeVonta Smith (born November 14, 1998) is an American football wide receiver for the Philadelphia Eagles of the National Football League (NFL). He played college football at Alabama, where he recorded over 1,800 yards with 23 touchdowns as a senior in 2020.

Smith was awarded the Heisman Trophy for his accomplishments alongside several other awards and honors. He was the first wide receiver to win the Heisman since Desmond Howard in 1991 and only the fourth overall. He also won two national championships while at Alabama prior to being selected by the Eagles tenth overall in the 2021 NFL Draft.

High school career
Smith attended Amite High Magnet School in his hometown of Amite City, Louisiana. He played basketball and football. He committed to the University of Alabama to play college football.

College career

2017 season 
As a true freshman at Alabama in 2017, Smith had eight receptions for 160 yards and three touchdowns in eight games. He scored his first collegiate touchdown on a 27-yard reception against Vanderbilt on September 23. In the 2018 College Football Playoff National Championship against Georgia, Smith's only catch of the game was the game-winning 41-yard touchdown reception in an overtime 26–23 victory.

2018 season 
In the College Football Playoff Semifinal at the Orange Bowl, Smith had six receptions for 104 yards and one touchdown in the 45–34 victory over Oklahoma. As a sophomore in 2018, Smith had 42 receptions for 693 yards and six touchdowns in 13 games.

2019 season 

On September 14, Smith had eight receptions for 136 receiving yards and two touchdowns in a 47–23 victory over South Carolina. On September 28, Smith set career highs with 274 yards and five touchdowns in a 59–31 victory against Ole Miss. On November 9, against LSU, he had seven receptions for 213 receiving yards and two touchdowns in the 46–41 loss. Smith led the Crimson Tide in receiving yards and receiving touchdowns, with 1,256 yards and 14 touchdowns on 68 receptions. 

After the season, his teammates Henry Ruggs and Jerry Jeudy forfeited their remaining NCAA eligibility to enter the 2020 NFL Draft, where they ended up as first-round picks, but Smith decided to return to Alabama for his senior year.

2020 season 
On October 10, against Ole Miss, Smith had 13 receptions for 164 receiving yards and one receiving touchdown to go along with a rushing touchdown in the 63–48 victory. In the following game, against Georgia, he had 11 receptions for 167 receiving yards and two receiving touchdowns in the 41–24 victory. On October 31, Smith had 11 receptions for 203 receiving yards and four touchdowns against Mississippi State in the 41–0 victory. Smith outgained the entire Bulldogs team 203–200 in the victory. On November 21, Smith broke the all-time SEC career record for most receiving touchdowns, with two to go along with nine receptions for 144 yards in a 63–3 victory over Kentucky. On November 28, in the Iron Bowl against Auburn, he had seven receptions for 171 yards and two touchdowns in the 42–13 victory. The following week, he had eight receptions for 231 receiving yards and three touchdowns in a 55–17 victory over LSU. In the SEC Championship against Florida, he had 15 receptions for 184 receiving yards and two touchdowns in the 52–46 victory. In the College Football Playoff Semifinal at the Rose Bowl Game, he had seven receptions for 130 receiving yards and three receiving touchdowns in the 31–14 victory. In the CFP National Championship Game against Ohio State, Smith set records for title game catches (12) and touchdown receptions (three), and also totaled 215 yards, despite leaving early in the third quarter with a hand injury. Alabama won, 52–24, their sixth title in 12 years, while Smith was named Offensive MVP of the championship game. Smith led the nation with 117 receptions, 1,856 receiving yards, and 23 receiving touchdowns.

Smith became the first wide receiver to win the AP Player of the Year award since its inception in 1998. Smith was selected over finalists Kyle Trask, Trevor Lawrence and teammate Mac Jones to win the 2020 Heisman Trophy, becoming the first wide receiver to win the award since Desmond Howard in 1991 and only the fourth overall.

While playing for Alabama, Smith set more than seven school receiving records. Smith accepted an invitation for the 2021 Senior Bowl but did not play. His nickname at Alabama was the "Slim Reaper", given to him by his teammates due to his small frame and athletic ability. Smith was named as a Consensus All-American. In addition, Smith won the Biletnikoff Award, the Maxwell Award, SEC Offensive Player of the Year, and the Walter Camp Player of the Year Award.

Professional career

Smith was selected by the Philadelphia Eagles with the tenth overall selection in the 2021 NFL Draft, who had traded up two spots with the Dallas Cowboys to select him. He was the third wide receiver taken in the draft after Ja'Marr Chase and Jaylen Waddle. Despite his impressive college statistics Smith fell in the draft due to concerns over his raw measurables and that his frame was considered too small to handle playing in the NFL.  

He signed a four-year rookie contract, worth $20.1 million, on June 3, 2021.

2021

In week 1, against the Atlanta Falcons, Smith scored his first career touchdown on his very first catch in the NFL. He had seven receptions for 122 yards in a Week 4 loss to the Kansas City Chiefs. In Week 10, against the Denver Broncos, Smith had two receiving touchdowns in the 30–13 victory. Smith had a solid rookie season for the Eagles, as he recorded 64 receptions for 916 yards and five touchdowns. His 916 yards set the Eagles rookie record for most receiving yards in a single season. Like the rest of the Eagles offense, Smith struggled during the team's 31–15 loss in the Wild Card Round to the  Tampa Bay Buccaneers, as he ended the game with four catches (on 11 targets) for 60 yards.

2022

In Week 3, against the Washington Commanders, Smith had eight catches for a career-high 169 yards and a touchdown in the 24–8 win. In Week 16 against the Dallas Cowboys, he had eight receptions for 113 receiving yards and two touchdowns in the 40–34 loss.

Smith had five games going over the 100-yard mark in the 2022 season. Smith finished his second season catching 95 passes for 1,196 yards and seven touchdowns. In the Divisional Round against the New York Giants, he had a receiving touchdown in the 38–7 victory. In the NFC Championship against the San Francisco 49ers, Smith recorded a one-handed 29-yard reception on fourth down on the Eagles' opening drive. The catch was later deemed to be incomplete, but the Eagles were able to get a quick snap off before it could be challenged or reviewed. The catch set up the Eagles with first-and-goal, which they were able to score a touchdown on. The Eagles won the game 31–7. In Super Bowl LVII against the Kansas City Chiefs, Smith had seven catches for 100 yards in the 38-35 loss.

NFL career statistics

Regular Season

Playoffs

See also
 List of NCAA major college football yearly receiving leaders
 List of NCAA Division I FBS career receiving touchdowns leaders

References

External links
 
 Philadelphia Eagles profile
 Alabama Crimson Tide profile
 

1998 births
Living people
African-American players of American football
Alabama Crimson Tide football players
All-American college football players
American football wide receivers
Heisman Trophy winners
Maxwell Award winners
People from Amite City, Louisiana
Philadelphia Eagles players
Players of American football from Louisiana